The large moth family Arctiidae contains the following genera with names beginning from A to M:

(For names beginning from N to Z, see List of arctiid genera: N–Z.)

A

B

C

D

E

F

G

H

I

J

K

L

M

References 

 List A
Arctiid